USS Namakagon (AOG-53) was a  built for the United States Navy during World War II. In some sources, the ship's name is also spelled Namakogon. After her decommissioning from the U.S. Navy in 1957, the former Namakagon served as Antarctic supply vessel HMNZS Endeavour (A184) for the Royal New Zealand Navy (1962–1971), and as ROCS Lung Chuan for the Republic of China Navy. Lung Chuan ended active service when she was decommissioned from the Republic of China Navy in 2005.

Service history

United States Navy career
Namakagon was laid down on 1 August 1944 by Cargill, Inc., Savage, Minnesota and was launched on 4 November 1944; sponsored by Mrs. Alfred J. Scobba. The ship was commissioned on 18 June 1945.

The gasoline tanker Namakagon completed her U.S. Gulf Coast shakedown and, having filled her tanks at Baytown, Texas, departed for the Pacific Ocean, 19 July 1945. She arrived at Pearl Harbor as hostilities in the Pacific ceased and on 20 August continued on to Midway Island. Based at Pearl Harbor, she carried fuel to various islands of the Pacific, including Johnston Island, Canton Island, Marcus Island, Truk, Guam, Saipan, Okinawa, Peleliu, and Kyūshū, for over 18 months, then returned to the U.S. West Coast.

In early June, 1947, she completed overhaul at San Pedro, California, and on the 9th steamed north to her new homeport, Kodiak, Alaska. From there and from ports in Washington, she carried passengers and mixed cargo as she operated a gasoline provisioning shuttle to naval bases and stations on the coast and in the Aleutians. Detached from Kodiak in 1953, she returned to Pearl Harbor, whence she operated until June 1957. She then sailed to Mare Island, California, where she decommissioned on 20 September 1957, and entered the Pacific Reserve Fleet.

Royal New Zealand Navy career
On 27 June 1962, custody of Namakagon was transferred to the Commandant, 12th Naval District for activation, following which she was transferred, under the Military Aid Program, to the Royal New Zealand Navy, on 5 October 1962. Commissioned as HMNZS Endeavour (A184), an Antarctic supply ship, she delivered fuel to research bases on the seventh continent, bringing over 1 million gallons each year to McMurdo Sound alone, since 1963.

Endeavour was decommissioned and returned to U.S. custody in 1971.

Republic of China Navy career
The former Namakagon was leased to the Republic of China Navy in 1971 and renamed ROCS Lung Chuan (AOG-515). Her pennant number was later changed to AOG-507. Although Lung Chuan remained in the custody of the Republic of China Navy, the vessel was returned to the U.S. on paper in 1976, struck from the American Naval Vessel Register on 15 April, and sold back to the Republic of China.  Lung Chuan was decommissioned on 1 April 2005 at Kaohsiung, Taiwan.  Her final disposition is unknown.

Military awards and honors
Namakagons crew was eligible for the following medals:
 American Campaign Medal
 Asiatic-Pacific Campaign Medal
 World War II Victory Medal
 Navy Occupation Service Medal (with Asia Clasp)
 National Defense Service Medal

See also
 Logistic ships of the Royal New Zealand Navy

Notes

References

External links
 NavSource Online: Service Ship Photo Archive - AOG-53 Namakogon

 

Patapsco-class gasoline tankers
Ships built in Savage, Minnesota
1944 ships
World War II auxiliary ships of the United States
Cold War auxiliary ships of the United States
Ships transferred from the United States Navy to the Royal New Zealand Navy
Auxiliary ships of the Royal New Zealand Navy
Patapsco-class gasoline tankers of the Republic of China Navy